KSI is a British YouTuber and rapper.

Songs

See also
 KSI discography

References

KSI